Since its first use in 1999, the National Weather Service (NWS) has used the Tornado Emergency bulletin, which is an enhanced form of a Tornado Warning used when a confirmed tornado poses a significant threat to life and property in a populated area. There have been 194 known tornado emergencies issued in the United States to date, and all but 16 have resulted in a confirmed tornado, with the resulting tornadoes being responsible for a total of 554 fatalities. 
Below is a listing of each individual emergency. Tornadoes that had multiple emergencies issued for them are displayed with the tornadoes' injuries, deaths, and references grouped together. Tornadoes emergencies with multiple tornadoes within them will be displayed with all tornadoes within the emergency section.

Chronology of events

1999–2009

2010–2019

2020–present

See also
 List of deadliest Storm Prediction Center days by outlook risk level
 List of Storm Prediction Center high risk days
 List of tornadoes and tornado outbreaks
 Particularly Dangerous Situation

References

Emergencies
National Weather Service
Tornado-related lists
Weather warnings and advisories